Category 4 is the second highest classification on the Saffir–Simpson hurricane wind scale and the Australian tropical cyclone intensity scale. The following lists show tropical cyclones that have reached that intensity in Earth's ocean basins.

List of Category 4 Atlantic hurricanes
List of Category 4 Pacific hurricanes
List of Category 4 Australian region severe tropical cyclones
List of Category 4 South Pacific severe tropical cyclones